Knorr is a surname. Notable people with the surname include:

Brian Knorr (born 1963), American football coach
Carl Heinrich Theodor Knorr (1800–1875), German businessman and founder of the company Knorr.
Christian Knorr von Rosenroth (1636–1689), Christian Hebraist
Eduard von Knorr (1840–1920), German admiral
Frances Knorr (1868–1894), English-Australian baby farmer and murderer
Fred Knorr (1913–1960), American radio executive
Georg Knorr (1859–1911), engineer and entrepreneur in railroad technology
Georg Wolfgang Knorr (1705–1761) German natural history illustrator from Nürnberg 
Hugo Knorr (1834-1904), German painter
Iwan Knorr (1853–1916), German teacher of music
Johnny Knorr (1921–2011), American musician and big band leader
Karen Knorr, American photographer
Karin Knorr Cetina (born 1944), Austrian sociologist
Ludwig Knorr (1859–1921), German chemist
Martin J. Knorr (1906–1989), New York politician
Micah Knorr (born 1975), NFL football player
Nathan Homer Knorr (1905–1977), third president of the Watchtower Bible and Tract Society
Randy Knorr (born 1968), American baseball player
 Robert Knorr (1865-1946), German historian, Roman ceramologist (sigillata)
Theresa Knorr (born 1946), American woman who murdered two children
Wilbur Knorr (1945–1997), American historian of mathematics and a professor

See also
Dmitrii Knorre (born 1926), Russian chemist
Viktor Knorre (1840–1919), Russian astronomer